Watertown is a city in and the county seat of Codington County, South Dakota, United States. Watertown is home to the Redlin Art Center which houses many of the original art works produced by Terry Redlin, one of America's most popular wildlife artists. Watertown is located between Pelican Lake and Lake Kampeska, from which Redlin derived inspiration for his artwork.

The population was 22,655 at the 2020 census, making Watertown the 5th largest city in South Dakota. It is also the principal city of the Watertown Micropolitan Statistical Area, which includes all of Codington and Hamlin counties. Watertown also is home to the Bramble Park Zoo. Watertown's residential real estate is considered the most expensive in South Dakota for cities of its size; the median price for a home in Watertown is approximately $200,000.

Geography
Watertown is located at  (44.903433, -97.120437), along the Big Sioux River.

Watertown sits on the Big Sioux River and two major lakes, Pelican Lake and Lake Kampeska. Most of Watertown also sits upon a short plateau. The elevation at Watertown Regional Airport is 1,745 feet.

Watertown has been assigned the ZIP code 57201 and the FIPS place code 69300.

History

Watertown was founded in 1879 as a rail terminus when the Chicago & Northwestern Railroad reactivated part of a line it had constructed to Lake Kampeska. Despite the prominence of rivers and lakes in the area, the city was named after Watertown, New York, the hometown of brothers John E. Kemp and Oscar P. Kemp, two of the city's founders. The town's name was originally planned to be named Kampeska.

During the 1880s, Watertown prospered as a transportation hub after the railroads had been extended farther west. Along with several other cities, Watertown had been a candidate as capital of the new state of South Dakota, although it lost out to the more centrally located Pierre. The city's current newspaper, the Watertown Public Opinion, began publishing in 1887.

In the mid-20th century, Interstate 29 was constructed through eastern South Dakota. The route included a slight bend to bring the interstate closer to Watertown. The interstate's construction has been a major economic benefit to Watertown and the large communities next to it.

Climate
In the last decades the climate is configured as hot-summer humid continental climate (Köppen: Dfa), although it had a warm-summer previously (Dfb). Although it is a humid city it is relatively dry for its climatic category, due to its position in the Great Plains, which still provides an even greater thermal amplitude, especially in the higher values.

Demographics

The per capita income for the city was $18,994. About 5.7% of families and 9.3% of the population were below the poverty line, including 8.5% of those under age 18 and 11.0% of those age 65 or over.

2010 census
As of the census of 2010, there were 21,482 people, 9,278 households, and 5,563 families residing in the city. The racial makeup of the city was 94.8% White, 0.4% African American, 2.4% Native American, 0.5% Asian, 0.5% from other races, and 1.4% from two or more races. Hispanic or Latino of any race were 1.6% of the population.

There were 9,278 households, of which 29.6% had children under the age of 18 living with them, 45.7% were married couples living together, 10.0% had a female householder with no husband present, 4.3% had a male householder with no wife present, and 40.0% were non-families. 33.0% of all households were made up of individuals, and 12.4% had someone living alone who was 65 years of age or older. The average household size was 2.28 and the average family size was 2.90.

The median age in the city was 36.6 years. 24.2% of residents were under the age of 18; 10.3% were between the ages of 18 and 24; 24.9% were from 25 to 44; 25.2% were from 45 to 64; and 15.4% were 65 years of age or older. The gender makeup of the city was 49.2% male and 50.8% female.

2000 census
As of the census of 2000, there were 20,237 people, 8,385 households, and 5,290 families residing in the city. The population density was 1,328.9 people per square mile (513.0/km2). There were 9,193 housing units at an average density of 603.7 per square mile (233.1/km2). The racial makeup of the city was 96.25% White, 0.14% African American, 1.65% Native American, 0.33% Asian, 0.02% Pacific Islander, 0.71% from other races, and 0.90% from two or more races. Hispanic or Latino of any race were 1.28% of the population. 47.1% were of German, 19.8% Norwegian and 5.9% Irish ancestry. 96.5% spoke English, 1.7% Spanish and 1.1% German as their first language.

There were 8,385 households, out of which 31.9% had children under the age of 18 living with them, 50.6% were married couples living together, 8.8% had a female householder with no husband present, and 36.9% were non-families. 30.5% of all households were made up of individuals, and 11.8% had someone living alone who was 65 years of age or older. The average household size was 2.37 and the average family size was 2.98.

In the city, the population was spread out, with 25.9% under the age of 18, 11.3% from 18 to 24, 27.9% from 25 to 44, 19.9% from 45 to 64, and 15.0% who were 65 years of age or older. The median age was 35 years. For every 100 females, there were 96.6 males. For every 100 females age 18 and over, there were 93.9 males.

Education
Watertown has two institutions providing post-secondary education. Lake Area Technical College is a public technical school classified as a community college, offering degrees in areas such as Agriculture, Nursing, and Welding. There is also a satellite campus of Mount Marty College, a private Catholic school based in Yankton, South Dakota.

Lake Area Technical College received the 2017 Aspen Prize for Community College Excellence, following three previous Finalist-With-Distinction honors in 2011, 2013, and 2015 (bi-annual competition/selection process). The Prize was awarded by the Aspen Institute in March 2017 in Washington, D.C. following an intense data collection process by Aspen officials that included a rigorous review of critical elements of student success including learning, completion, and employment after college.

Watertown has one public high school, Watertown High School, and one private boarding school, Great Plains Lutheran High School, of the Wisconsin Evangelical Lutheran Synod.

Watertown Middle School (7th and 8th grades) is the only public middle school in Watertown. Construction of the Middle School was completed in August 2015. The community's “Prairie Lakes Wellness Center”, opened in 2017, is adjacent to the Middle School. When the Middle School opened in 2015, the prior middle school was completely renovated and became the Intermediate School (5th and 6th grades).

There are multiple elementary schools in Watertown. The five public elementary schools include: Lincoln Elementary, Jefferson Elementary, Roosevelt Elementary, McKinnely Elementary, and Mellette Elementary. Immaculate Conception School is a private Catholic elementary school. St. Martin's Lutheran School is a private Lutheran elementary school of the WELS. Watertown Christian School is a private non-denominational Christian elementary school.

The Watertown Regional Library is the town's main library, located on 6th St. NE, and open every day of the week.

Harmony Hill High School was a Catholic girls boarding school in Watertown from 1967 to 1974.

Points of interest

 Redlin Art Center
 Bramble Park Zoo
 Codington County Heritage Museum
 Mellette House
 Watertown Family Aquatic Center
 Watertown Stadium
 Lake Kampeska
 Pelican Lake
 Watertown Regional Library

Local media
 Newspaper
 The Watertown Public Opinion is the local daily newspaper.

Television

AM radio

FM radio

Transportation

 Interstate 29-serves Watertown at Exits 177 and 180
 U.S. Highway 81
 U.S. Highway 212
 South Dakota Highway 20

20th Avenue South, 20th Avenue Southeast, and 29th Street Southeast-Alternate City Truck Route around the south side of Watertown. 
448th Avenue and North Lake Drive-Former South Dakota Highway 139; runs along the west side of Lake Kampeska.

Watertown also has one airport, Watertown Regional Airport, served by two commercial airlines, and local bus service provided by the Watertown Area Transit Corporation.

Notable people

 Cleveland Abbott (Tuskegee Institute) Multiple hall of fame coach and educator
 Sylvia Bacon (born 1931), Judge of the Superior Court, District of Columbia
 Nancy Turbak Berry, trial attorney and South Dakota state senator
 Stephen Foster Briggs (1885-1976), founder Briggs & Stratton Corporation
 John Hamre (born 1950), Deputy Secretary of Defense and international studies specialist
 Fred H. Hildebrandt, U.S. Representative from South Dakota
 Wendell Hurlbut (1918-2011), amusement park designer
 J. A. Jance (born 1944), writer
 Charles B. Kornmann (born 1937), federal judge on United States District Court for the District of South Dakota
 Jake Krull (1938-2016), U.S. General and South Dakota state senator
 George R. Mather, General in the U.S. Army, Commander in Chief, United States Southern Command (USCINCSO) from 1969 to 1971
 Arthur C. Mellette, (1842-1896), last Dakota Territorial Governor and first Governor of the State of South Dakota.
 Kristi Noem, (born 1971), current Governor of the State of South Dakota.
 Hope A. Olson, author and professor in the field of information studies
Henry Roberts Pease (1837-1907) Civil War veteran and United States Senator from Mississippi
 Lee Raymond, (born 1938), chemical engineer and long-time Chairman and CEO, Exxon Corporation and ExxonMobil, born and attended primary and secondary school in Watertown
 Terry Redlin (1937-2016), wildlife artist and Redlin Art Center
 Bob Scholtz (born 1937), American football player
 Joseph Schull (6 February 1906 – 19 May 1980), Canadian playwright and historian
 Ramona Solberg (1921-2005), jeweler
 Lee Schoenbeck (born 1958), lawyer and current President Pro Tempore of the State Senate
 Neal Tapio (born 1970), businessman and former Trump presidential campaign director for South Dakota
 Timmy Williams (born 1981), American comedian of The Whitest Kids U' Know
 Roger Zwieg (1942-2015), NASA test pilot and flight instructor

Notable visitors
Former President Barack Obama has visited the city twice, first in 2008 during his presidential campaign, and again on May 8, 2015, to address the graduating class of 2015 from Lake Area Technical College.

Major employers
According to the City's 2018 Comprehensive Annual Financial Report, the largest employers in the city are:

References

Bibliography

External links

 
 Watertown Area Chamber of Commerce
 Watertown Public Opinion - local newspaper
 Watertown Regional Library Website
 School District Website

 
Cities in Codington County, South Dakota
Cities in South Dakota
County seats in South Dakota
Watertown, South Dakota micropolitan area